Yenny may refer to:

People
 Yenny Acuña (born 1997), Chilean footballer
 Yenny Sinisterra (born 2000), Colombian weightlifter
 Yenny Wahid (born 1974), Indonesian Islamic activist, journalist, and politician
 Park Ye-eun (born 1989), South Korean singer, songwriter and composer, professionally known as Yenny

Other uses
 Yenny, a comic series by David Álvarez (artist)

See also
 Jenny (disambiguation)